Philippe Gautier (born ) is a Belgian lawyer. He currently serves as the registrar of the International Court of Justice. Born in Bujumbura, Burundi, Gautier received his license to practice law in 1982, and served in various capacities in the arbitration of international disputes.

On 22 May 2019, Gautier was elected by the members of the court to a seven-year term as Registrar of the Court, beginning 1 August 2019.

Gautier previously worked at the Center for International and European Law of the Université catholique de Louvain. He has written various books and articles in the field.

References

External links 
 Official website

1960 births
Living people
People from Bujumbura
Academic staff of the Université catholique de Louvain
Belgian judges of United Nations courts and tribunals
International Court of Justice judges